Migraine is a debilitating condition characterized by headaches and nausea.

Migraine may also refer to:

Migraine (book), a book by neurologist Oliver Sacks
Project Migraine, a post-World War II U.S. Navy program to convert fleet submarines into radar picket submarines
"Migraine" (song), a 2007 Tagalog-language song by Moonstar88
"Migraine", a song by Twenty One Pilots from the album Vessel
Migraine, a record label from NYC, set up by Teenage Jesus and the Jerks